William Courtenay (1342–1396) was an Archbishop of Canterbury

William Courtenay may also refer to:
William Courtenay, 1st Earl of Devon (1475–1511)
Sir William Courtenay (1451–1512)
Sir William Courtenay (1477–1535), MP for Devon
Sir William Courtenay (died 1557) (c. 1529–1557), de jure 2nd Earl of Devon
Sir William Courtenay (died 1630) (1553–1630), de jure 3rd Earl of Devon
Sir William Courtenay, 1st Baronet (1628–1702), de jure 5th Earl of Devon
Sir William Courtenay, 2nd Baronet (1676–1735), de jure 6th Earl of Devon
William Courtenay, 1st Viscount Courtenay (1709–1762), de jure 7th Earl of Devon
William Courtenay, 2nd Viscount Courtenay (1742–1788), de jure 8th Earl of Devon 
William Courtenay, 9th Earl of Devon (1768–1835)
William Courtenay, 10th Earl of Devon (1777–1859), British aristocrat and politician
William Courtenay, 11th Earl of Devon (1807–1888)
John Nichols Thom or William Courtenay (1799–1838), Cornish rebel leader
William Courtenay (actor) (1875–1933), American stage and film actor
William Courtenay (filmmaker) (1896–1960), British film maker
William Courtenay, in 1455, MP for Somerset
William Courtenay (MP for Fowey) (c. 1582–1603), eldest son of 3rd Earl of Devon, represented Fowey
William Ashmead Courtenay (1831–1908),  mayor of Charleston, South Carolina

See also
William Courtney (disambiguation)
Earl of Devon